{{safesubst:#invoke:RfD||2=Color Lines (Loop)|month = March
|day =  8
|year = 2023
|time = 19:03
|timestamp = 20230308190347

|content=
redirect The Loop (CTA)

}}